Callionymus ogilbyi, the Eastern Australian longtail dragonet, is a species of dragonet endemic to the Pacific waters off of New South Wales, Australia. The specific name honours the Irish-Australian zoologist and taxonomist James Douglas Ogilby (1853-1925).

References 

O
Fish described in 2002